Shalen Lal (born 3 July 1986) is a Fijian footballer who has represented several Fijian football clubs. He is the current head coach of Fiji national under-17 football team.

Club career

He started his football career in Toorak with the League Club as a 19-year-old and played for Suva for 13 years winning the Fiji FACT, Battle of the Giants and National Football League titles with the team in the mid-1990s.

International career

Lal has assisted in multiple national team campaigns and played the head coach role for top Fiji club Ba FC in the past, but having full responsibility of a national youth team has been a totally new experience. Lal plans to continue his development as a coach and pick up his OFC A Licence as his next project, but that personal goal has been put on hold while he focuses all his energy on his young side's success at the OFC U-17 Championship.

References

External links
 Lal honoured to lead Fiji

1986 births
Living people
Fiji international footballers
Fiji national football team managers
Fijian football managers
Fijian footballers
Association football defenders
2008 OFC Nations Cup players
Fijian people of Indian descent